Ralph Aitken (16 February 1863 – 10 January 1928) was a Scottish international footballer.

Career
Aitken played for Dumbarton, Newcastle West End, and Scotland.

Honours
Dumbarton
 Scottish Cup: Runners Up 1886–87
 2 caps for Scotland between 1885 and 1888, scoring 1 goal
 6 representative caps for Dumbartonshire between 1883 and 1889, scoring 2 goals.

References

External links 

Ralph Aitken, London Hearts
Ralph Aitken (The Sons Archive - Dumbarton Football Club History)

1863 births
1928 deaths
Footballers from Renfrewshire
Association football wingers
Scottish footballers
Scotland international footballers
Dumbarton F.C. players
Newcastle West End F.C. players